Habs is a 2022 Pakistani television drama series which airs on ARY Digital, written by Aliya Makhdoom, directed by Musaddiq Malik in his directorial debut, and produced by Six Sigma Plus. The series features Ushna Shah and Feroze Khan in lead roles.

It received positive to mixed reviews from critics.

Premise 
The story revolves around two individuals from different socioeconomic backgrounds who are struggling in their lives. They are bound together by fate and try to solve the misunderstandings created by circumstances and people around them.

Plot 
The story starts with Ayesha trying to find a job after receiving a medal from her university because her family is in a financial crisis. Her family consists of her mother Qudsia, her aunt Bobby, and her two sisters Bano and Zoya. Qudsia wants her daughters to marry to rich people, because of the financial crisis. She never allowed Bobby to marry, since the groom wasn't rich. She is hired by a company, and she starts working for the rich boss of the company, Basit Salman Khan.

Basit is a short-tempered man and he has a hateful relationship with his mother Sadia, because Sadia left Basit to live with her lover. Basit has been living with his father Salman ever since, and he has always opposed marriage due to his childhood trauma, but after Salman dies, Basit reads in his will that the company will belong to him once he marries. Basit tries to marry his friend Soha, but after she sees him in a rush to marry, Soha refuses to marry Basit. After Sadia tries to take over Basit's company, Basit lies to her saying that he has married Ayesha, who is shocked.

Bano is in a relationship with Talaal, but after her mother rejects them due to not being rich and Talaal's mother becoming sick, Talaal marries Zainab, and Bano breaks up with him. Qudsia then meets Basit and decides to have him and Ayesha marry, but Basit pays Qudsia 75 lakh rupees for their marriage, on Qudsia's request. After their marriage, Basit fires Ayesha from her job, which angers her. Sadia then dies after Basit embarrasses her on his birthday which leaves Basit with guilt and questions he'll never have the answer to.

Zoya is in a relationship with Aamir, but after Basit embarrasses Aamir after Aamir's mother Bilquis asks for dowry, Zoya runs away and elopes with Aamir. Ayesha hides this from Basit, since she thinks that Basit will think bad about her family, so she tells his friend Fahad about Zoya, but Basit then suspects that Fahad and Ayesha are having an affair. Basit expels Fahad and Ayesha from the house, and after he gets into an accident, Fahad tells him the truth about Zoya, and Basit regrets mistreating Ayesha. Basit asks for forgiveness, and Ayesha forgives him, and they live happily until Soha returns and sees how Basit and Ayesha's relationship isn't working, and she tries to divide them. Ayesha is then revealed to be pregnant. Zoya returns, but after it is revealed that Zoya stole 1 lakh from Bilquis, Qudsia lies to Aamir saying that Zoya is pregnant, so Aamir doesn't divorce Zoya.

Ultimately, Aamir learns of Zoya's lies, and almost divorces her. Fahad tells Soha about the 75 lakh rupees, so she tells Ayesha this as well, which breaks her heart. She runs away, with Soha's help, blinded by Soha's compassion. Basit tries to find Ayesha, but to no avail. Bano warns Soha to stay away from Basit and Ayesha, so Soha tells Basit that she told Ayesha about his and Qudsia's deal, which Ayesha hears. Ayesha becomes mad at Basit and Soha, and she asks for divorce from Basit. Basit agrees, and they almost divorce but Basit asks Ayesha to meet him one last time after he tells her he is leaving Pakistan, forever.

Meanwhile, Zoya begs for forgiveness from Aamir, but he tells her it will take him some time to forgive her. Basit tells Ayesha he is handing the house to Ayesha for her and her child, but Ayesha, worrying whether her child will ask about Basit in the future and seeing how much Basit has changed, forgives Basit and reunites with him forever. Three years later, Bobby is getting married, Zoya and Aamir have reunited, Fahad and Bano are married, Qudsia is happy, and Basit and Ayesha are celebrating with their daughter named Sadia, after Basit's mother. Everyone takes a group picture together, and live happily ever after.

Cast 

 Ushna Shah as Ayesha Basit Khan, Basit's wife
 Feroze Khan as Basit Salman Khan, Ayesha's husband 
 Ayesha Omar as Soha, Basit's friend and ex-fiancée
 Saba Faisal as Qudsiya, Ayesha, Bano and Zoya's mother
 Dania Enwer as Bano Sadiq, Ayesha and Zoya's eldest sister
 Janice Tessa as Zoya Sadiq, Ayesha and  Bano's youngest sister, Aamir's wife
 Hina Rizvi as Bobby, Ayesha, Bano and Zoya's father's sister
 Isra Ghazal as Sadia, Basit's mother, Ayesha's mother-in-law (dead)
 Mussadiq Malik as Fahad, Basit's best friend
 Imran Aslam as Talal Rasheed, Bano's love interest
 Shazia Qaiser as Shamsa, Talal's mother
 Hamzah Tariq Jamil as Aamir, Zoya's husband 
 Fareeda Shabbir as Bilquis, Aamir's mother
 Birjees Farooqui as Fehmida, Fahad's mother
 Hammad Farooq as Kareem, Basit's friend

Guest cast 
 Jawed Sheikh as Salman Khan, Basit's father, Ayesha's father-in-law (Episode 1)
 Anoushay Abbasi as Fahad's wife (Episode 25)

Episodes

Reception
While reviewing the first episode, Cutacut.com said it had a "strong start" and called the storyline relatable and intriguing. The News gave the initial episodes an inappreciable review stating that the story has nothing new with already done topics of Abandonment issues and hatred of mothers. Maliha Rehman of Dawn praised the direction and actors' performances but mentioned the difference of the story from the title.

References

External links
 

2022 Pakistani television series debuts